In classical scholarship, the editio princeps (plural: editiones principes) of a work is the first printed edition of the work, that previously had existed only in manuscripts, which could be circulated only after being copied by hand. The following is a list of Greek literature works.

Greek works

15th century

16th century

17th century

18th century - present

References

Textual scholarship
Greek-language books